Ban Haet is a district (amphoe) of Khon Kaen province, northeastern Thailand.

History
The minor district (king amphoe) was established on 1 April 1995 with area split off from Ban Phai district.

On 15 May 2007, all 81 minor districts in Thailand were upgraded to full districts. With publication in the Royal Gazette on 24 August the upgrade became official.

Geography
Neighboring districts are (from the south clockwise) Ban Phai, Mancha Khiri, Phra Yuen, Mueang Khon Kaen of Khon Kaen Province, and Kosum Phisai of Maha Sarakham province.

Administration
The district is divided into four sub-districts (tambons), which are further subdivided into 45 villages (mubans). The township (thesaban tambon) Ban Haet covers parts of tambon Ban Haet. There are a further four tambon administrative organizations (TAO).

References

External links
amphoe.com

Ban Haet